Mariniluteicoccus endophyticus is a Gram-positive, aerobic and non-motil bacterium from the genus Mariniluteicoccus which has been isolated from the root of the plant Ocimum basilicum from Shilin County, China.

References 

Propionibacteriales
Bacteria described in 2016